The 2021–22 Florida Gators women's basketball team represents the University of Florida during the 2021–22 NCAA Division I women's basketball season. The Gators, led by first-year head coach Kelly Rae Finley, play their home games at the O'Connell Center and compete as members of the Southeastern Conference (SEC).

Previous season
The Gators finished the season 12–14 (3–11 SEC) to finish in twelfth place in the conference. The Gators were invited to the 2021 Women's National Invitation Tournament where defeated Charlotte in the first round before being eliminated by Villanova in the second round. Head coach Cameron Newbauer resigned in July 2021. Allegations of abuse from former players surfaced in September.

Offseason

Departures

2021 recruiting class

Incoming transfer

Roster

Schedule

|-
!colspan=9 style=| Exhibition

|-
!colspan=9 style=| Non-conference regular season

|-
!colspan=9 style=| SEC regular season

|-
!colspan=9 style=| SEC Tournament

|-
!colspan=9 style=| NCAA tournament

See also
2021–22 Florida Gators men's basketball team

References

Florida Gators women's basketball seasons
Florida
Florida Gators women's basketball
Florida Gators women's basketball
Florida